The Corrente River is a river of Goiás state in central Brazil. It is a tributary of the Paranã River.

See also
List of rivers of Goiás

References
Brazilian Ministry of Transport

Rivers of Goiás